Real-Admiral Rémi Léon Louis Marie Joseph Monaque (b. 24 August 1936) is a French Navy officer and naval historian.

Biography 
Monaque joined the École navale in 1955, rising the Ensign 2nd class on 1 October 1956, and to Ensign 1st class on 1 October 1958.

By then a Lieutenant de vaisseau, Monaque took command of the River-class frigate Découverte in April 1971. On 21 May 1976, he has been promoted to Lieutenant-Commander and was given command of the T52-type frigate Béarnais.

Transferred ashore, he worked at the Navy General staff, in the Ministry of Defence and at the École supérieure de guerre navale.

Monaque retired from the Navy with the rank of Rear Admiral after a 37-year career.

Monaque has authored several books about the French Navy of the 18th and 19th centuries, especially the navy of the First French Empire.

Sources and references 
Publications
 
 
 
  Grand Prix de la Fondation Napoléon.
 
 , Grand prix de l'Académie de marine 2017

References

21st-century French historians
Naval historians